Benoîte Rencurel (1647–1718) was a shepherdess from Saint-Étienne-le-Laus, France who is said to have seen apparitions from the Virgin Mary from 1664 to 1718. The apparitions became known as Our Lady of Laus, and the site receives thousands of pilgrim visits a year. On 4 May 2008, Bishop Jean-Michel di Falco of the Diocese of Gap officially recognized the apparitions of the Virgin Mary to Benoite Rencurel at the Sanctuary of Laus in the area of Hautes-Alpes, France.

Life
Benoîte Rencurel was born on September 16, 1647, in the little town of Saint-Étienne d'Avançon, in the southern Alps. Her parents lived modestly from the works of their hands. Her father, Guillaume Rencurel, died when Benoîte was seven years old. For the widow and her daughters, his death would lead to material destitution. There was no school in Saint-Etienne d'Avançon and so Benoîte never learned to read or write. At the age of twelve, she found work as a shepherdess.

In a homily during a Mass at the Marian basilica in the town of Laus, Archbishop Georges Pontier of Marseille, France, said that Rencurel had first seen Mary after being guided by a strange scent near her home in Saint-Etienne d'Avancon in May 1664 and later experienced a vision of Christ bleeding on the village cross.

During the apparitions, the Blessed Mother asked for a church and a house for priests to be built, with the intention of drawing people to greater conversion, especially through the sacrament of penance. The holy site now draws 120,000 pilgrims annually. Numerous physical healings have also been associated with the site, especially when oil from a lamp is applied on the wounds according to the directives the Virgin Mary gave to Rencurel.

She became a Third Order Dominican and ministered to pilgrims and penitents as a lay Dominican tertiary in Laus. She also urged women to be modest.

At the shrine in Laus, Benoîte is said to have had the gift of reading hearts and so many people came to ask her advice that she had to attend mass through a small window in the gallery of the Church to escape the crowds who sought to overwhelm her. She claimed to receive visions of Jesus in His passion from 1669 to 1679. She died on Christmas Day 1718.

The very modern message of Benoite, Bishop di Falco stated, is "to live heart to heart with God in prayer, enter deeper into conversion where we are reconciled with ourselves, with others and with God, and live your mission where your life is, in everyday community and joy."

She was bestowed the title Servant of God by Pope Pius IX. On 3 April 2009, Pope Benedict XVI declared Benoîte "The Venerable".

See also

 Lucia dos Santos
 Francisco and Jacinta Marto
 Maximin Giraud
 Mélanie Calvat

References

External links

 Sanctuary of Our Lady of Laus — Official website

Stigmatics
Marian apparitions
Visions of Jesus and Mary
Shrines to the Virgin Mary
French beatified people
Lay Dominicans
1647 births
1718 deaths
Shepherds
People from Hautes-Alpes
Venerated Catholics by Pope Benedict XVI